Burgruine Rauhenstein is a castle in Baden bei Wien, Lower Austria, Austria. It was constructed in the 12th century. It is known to be the location where Karl van Beethoven, Ludwig van Beethoven's nephew,  attempted suicide in July 1826.

See also
List of castles in Austria

References
This article was initially translated from the German Wikipedia.

Castles in Lower Austria